The Pillar is an American news website focusing on the Catholic Church. The site's stated mission is to "do serious, responsible, sober journalism about the Church, from the Church, and for the Church."

The site was founded in 2021 by two journalist canon lawyers: J.D. Flynn, former editor-in-chief of Catholic News Agency and former chancellor of the Archdiocese of Denver, and Ed Condon, former Washington, D.C., bureau editor of the Catholic News Agency.

Publication history
Notable pieces published by the site include a March 2021 story on the financial impact to parishes around the country due to COVID-19 pandemic shutdowns, and a July 2021 story which reported on cell phone location data which showed Monsignor Jeffrey Burrill, the top administrator of the United States Conference of Catholic Bishops, had frequented gay bars and the Grindr app.

Burrill resigned from the USCCB after The Pillar notified the USCCB that it was going to publish the story. The site's methods of obtaining Burrill's location history were legal, but raised privacy concerns.  In a Religion News Service column appearing in the Washington Post, theology professor Steven P. Millies wrote that the Pillar "must not have thought about the Code of Canon Law" and "The Pillar’s investigators paid little heed also to the canons of ethics for journalists". Others, including Matthew Hennessey of The Wall Street Journal, dismissed allegations of homophobic intent while applauding the reporting with a favorable comparison it to similar phone data-based reporting by The New York Times.

References

Further reading

External links 
 Official website

2021 establishments in the United States
Online magazines published in the United States
Political magazines published in the United States
Internet properties established in 2021
Catholic media